Woollard is a small village on the River Chew in the affluent Chew Valley in England. It is in the Bath and North East Somerset council area and the ceremonial county of Somerset.

The special architectural and historic interest of Woollard was recognised by its designation as a Conservation Area on 25 July 1990.

History 
Woollard had a medieval bridge with three pointed arches and double arch-ribs. This was rebuilt following the substantial damage caused by the floods of 1968.

It is close to the route of the ancient Wansdyke, and lies on the Monarch's Way long-distance footpath.

Woollard is also a traditional surname, having relations in the farming land of Saffron Walden and Suffolk.

Government and politics 
Woollard is partly in the civil parish of Compton Dando and partly in the civil parish of Publow.  It is part of the Farmborough Ward, which is represented by one councillor on the Bath and North East Somerset Unitary Authority which has responsibilities for services such as education, refuse, tourism etc. The village is a part of the North East Somerset constituency. Prior to Brexit in 2020, it was part of the South West England constituency of the European Parliament.

Demographics 
According to the 2001 Census, the Farmborough Ward (which includes Compton Dando, Marksbury, Hunstrete and Chewton Keynsham), had 1,111 residents, living in 428 households, with an average age of 44.5 years. Of these 71% of residents describing their health as 'good', 21% of 16- to 74-year-olds had no qualifications; and the area had an unemployment rate of 1.0% of all economically active people aged 16–74. In the Index of Multiple Deprivation 2004, it was ranked at 22,100 out of 32,482 wards in England, where 1 was the most deprived LSOA and 32,482 the least deprived.

Listed Buildings 
Woollard has a variety of Grade II listed buildings:

References

Bibliography

External links 

 Parish website
 Chew Valley website
 River Chew website
 Map of Woollard circa 1900
 Woollard Conservation Area Character Appraisal

Villages in Bath and North East Somerset